The fourteenth season of The Real Housewives of Orange County, an American reality television series, is broadcast on Bravo. It aired on August 6, 2019, until December 26, 2019, and is primarily filmed in Orange County, California. Its executive producers are Adam Karpel, Alex Baskin, Douglas Ross, Gregory Stewart, Scott Dunlop, Stephanie Boyriven and Andy Cohen.

The fourteenth season of The Real Housewives of Orange County focuses on the lives of Tamra Judge, Shannon Storms Beador, Kelly Dodd, Gina Kirschenheiter, Emily Simpson and Braunwyn Windham-Burke. Original housewife Vicki Gunvalson appeared as a friend of the housewives.

Cast and synopsis
Following the conclusion of the thirteenth season, Vicki Gunvalson was demoted to a friend after thirteen seasons of being a main housewife. Tamra Judge, Shannon Beador, Kelly Dodd, Gina Kirschenheiter and Emily Simpson all returned with new cast member Braunwyn Windham-Burke joining the show. Former housewives Alexis Bellino and Meghan King Edmonds also returned in guest appearance. Gunvalson’s demotion made the series the second Real Housewives franchise to not retain any original cast members as full-time participants after season 8 of The Real Housewives of Atlanta.

Following the season finale, Gunvalson departed the franchise after fourteen seasons. Soon after, Tamra Judge announced her departure from the show as well.

 During her appearance at the reunion, Gunvalson sat at the top of the left couch, replacing Beador. Beador, Judge, and Kirschenheiter all moved down one seat so she could be seated.

Episodes

References

External links

 
 
 

2019 American television seasons
Orange County (season 14)